Autódromo Ciudad de Mar del Plata is a  motorsports circuit located in Buenos Aires, Argentina.

Lap records 

The official race lap records at the Autódromo Ciudad de Mar del Plata are listed as:

References

Motorsport venues in Buenos Aires Province